Gary Grigsby's War in Russia is a 1993 computer wargame developed and published by Strategic Simulations, Inc. Designed by Gary Grigsby, it is adapted from the 1990 title Second Front: Germany Turns East, itself adapted from Grigsby's 1984 War in Russia.

Gameplay
Gary Grigsby's War in Russia is a computer wargame that simulates the Eastern Front conflict during World War II, in the war between Germany and Soviet Russia. It features a map editor that allows players to create custom scenarios.

Development
War in Russia was based on designer Gary Grigsby's earlier title Second Front: Germany Turns East, itself based on his game War in Russia. According to Ed Dille of Electronic Games, an important part of the new game was to address concerns in Second Front that "units retained too much mobility". The game also added a mouse-based interface, new battles and VGA graphics.

Reception

Computer Gaming Worlds M. Evan Brooks wrote, "A workmanlike simulation, WIR should be acquired by any grognard who does not have Second Front." Reviewing it for Electronic Games, Ed Dille was somewhat mixed on the game. Conversely, William R. Trotter of Game Players PC Entertainment was strongly positive toward it, and believed that it would "become a landmark in the history of computer war games."

Legacy
In 2007, Retro Gamer reported that Gary Grigsby's War in Russia "is regarded by some as Grigsby's finest SSI outing."

In August 2000, publisher Matrix Games launched an updated re-release of War in Russia, made available as freeware. Grigsby had joined Matrix earlier that year. The new War in Russia came amid Matrix's re-releases of Grigsby's titles Steel Panthers and Pacific War.

References

External links

1993 video games
Computer wargames
DOS games
DOS-only games
Strategic Simulations games
Turn-based strategy video games
Video games about Nazi Germany
Video games developed in the United States
Video games set in the Soviet Union
World War II video games